Marivita byunsanensis is a Gram-negative, pleomorphic and non-motile bacterium from the genus of Marivita which has been isolated from tidal flat sediments from Byunsan in Korea.

References 

Rhodobacteraceae
Bacteria described in 2010